Eileen Naseby (born 1943) is the Australian author of Ursula, A Voyage of Love and Drama, the book is the biography of Naseby's mother, Ursula. 

The biography tells the compelling story of her escape from the Nazi regime, her closeted upbringing in Palestine, her love affair with the adventurer and writer Laurens van der Post, and her eventual emigration with the baby Eileen and her new husband Nigel - a gentle idealist - to an Australian outback Queensland dairy farm. Ursula eventually converted from Judaism, along with Nigel, to the Baháʼí Faith. 

The author Eileen Naseby was born in Haifa, but Ursula left Eileen's father soon after her birth. In her early childhood Eileen emigrated to Australia with her mother and stepfather, growing up on the remote dairy farm with two younger brothers and three sisters.

Married to the painter David Naseby in the mid 1960s, Eileen raised four children before establishing Australia's leading stock footage archival film library, Film World. With Film World and Murdoch Books Eileen produced the Australian Memories series of photographic books, showcasing images from Film World's Cinesound Movietone Archive.

Eileen has received several fellowships to Varuna, The Writers' House in the Blue Mountains of NSW, and is now at work on a novel.

External links
 

1943 births
Australian biographers
Living people